Čemernik (Serbian Cyrillic: Чемерник) is a mountain in southeastern Serbia, near the town of Surdulica. It is one of mountains that surround the Vlasina plateau and the Vlasina Lake.

References

Mountains of Serbia
Rhodope mountain range